Pitlochry Community Hospital is a health facility in Ferry Road, Pitlochry, Scotland. It is managed by NHS Tayside.

History
The facility was intended to replace the aging Irvine Memorial Hospital and was procured under a private finance initiative contract in 2005. It was designed by Campbell and Arnott and incorporates a GP's facility known as the Atholl Medical Centre. The facility was built by Stewart Milne Construction at a cost of £7 million, was opened by Nicola Sturgeon, Cabinet Secretary for Health and Wellbeing, in August 2008.

References

Hospitals in Perth and Kinross
Hospital buildings completed in 2008
2008 establishments in Scotland
Hospitals established in 2008
NHS Scotland hospitals
Buildings and structures in Pitlochry